Seton Montgomery Airlie, also known as Jock Airlie (22 March 1920 – 12 May 2008) was a Scottish professional footballer who played as a centre forward.

Career
Born in Carmyle, Airlie played in Scotland, France and England for Greyfriars, Celtic, Cannes and Worcester City.

References

1920 births
2008 deaths
Scottish footballers
Celtic F.C. players
AS Cannes players
Worcester City F.C. players
Scottish Football League players
Association football forwards
Footballers from Glasgow
Scottish expatriate footballers
Expatriate footballers in France
Scottish expatriate sportspeople in France